Oxymetopon is a genus of fish formerly classified in the family Microdesmidae but now classified in the Gobiidae. They are native to the western Pacific Ocean. They are sometimes called ribbon-gobies.

Species
There are currently 5 recognized species in this genus:
 Oxymetopon compressum W. L. Y. Chan, 1966 (Robust ribbongoby)
 Oxymetopon curticauda Prokofiev, 2016 
 Oxymetopon cyanoctenosum Klausewitz & Condé (fr), 1981 (Blue-barred ribbongoby)
 Oxymetopon filamentosum Fourmanoir, 1967
 Oxymetopon typus Bleeker, 1861 (Sail-fin ribbongoby)

References

Microdesmidae
Gobiidae
Taxa named by Pieter Bleeker